Novhorod-Siverskyi is a historic city in Chernihiv Oblast, Ukraine. It is the administrative center of Novhorod-Siverskyi Raion, although until 18 July 2020 it was incorporated as a city of oblast significance and did not belong to the raion. Novhorod-Siverskyi is situated on the bank of the Desna River,  from the capital, Kyiv. It hosts the administration of Novhorod-Siverskyi urban hromada, one of the hromadas of Ukraine.

History
The town was first chronicled in 1044. From 1098 it was the capital of the Siverian Principality, which served as a buffer zone against incursions of the Cumans (Polovtsy) and other steppe peoples. One of the numerous campaigns of local princes against the Cumans produced the great monument of early East Slavic literature, the Tale of Igor's Campaign.

After the town's destruction by Mongols in 1239, it passed to the princes of Bryansk and then to the Grand Dukes of Lithuania. It was ruled by Dymitr Korybut (Kaributas), son of Algirdas. Muscovy obtained the area following the Battle of Vedrosha in 1503, but lost it to Poland after the Time of Troubles, when it submitted to False Dmitry I in the Battle of Novhorod-Siverskyi. Nowogród Siewierski was granted Magdeburg city rights in 1620 by Polish King Sigismund III Vasa. It was the easternmost powiat (county) seat of Poland. The town passed to Russia as a result of the Russo-Polish War (1654-1667). During the Cossack epoch, it received the status of military company town (sotenne misto) and later regimental town (polkove misto); these were military and administrative divisions in the Cossack army and country. Also Novhorod-Siverskyi became a cultural center of Left-bank Ukraine. It was made the capital of a separate namestnichestvo in 1782–97. Thereafter its importance steadily declined.

During World War II, Novhorod-Siverskyi was occupied by the German Army from 26 August 1941 to 16 September 1943.

Until 18 July 2020, Novhorod-Siverskyi was designated as a city of oblast significance and did not belong to Novhorod-Siverskyi Raion even though it was the center of the raion. As part of the administrative reform of Ukraine, which reduced the number of raions of Chernihiv Oblast to four, the city was merged into Novhorod-Siverskyi Raion. During the 24 February 2022 Russian Invasion of Ukraine, it was occupied by Russian forces.

Architecture
Despite historic disasters, the town has preserved many architectural monuments, and a branch of the Chernihiv State Historical and Architectural Preserve has been established. The town has managed to maintain random planning in its landscape. The boundary of the town historical center remains vague.

Tourist attractions are located on two high capes divided by ravines: the ensemble of Our Savior and Transfiguration Monastery and the town centre. The architectural monuments of state significance are scattered on five separate areas which compose the territory of the preserve. The biggest area is the territory of Our Savior and Transfiguration Monastery. The other areas are Uspensky (Dormition) Cathedral, the wooden St. Nicolas church, a triumphal arch, and shopping arcades.

There are constructions and residential buildings from the 18th and 19th centuries in the town centre. The main point of interest in the town is the former residence of the Chernihiv metropolitans, the monastery of the Saviour's Transfiguration. It features a Neoclassical cathedral (1791–1796, designed by Giacomo Quarenghi), 17th century stone walls, and several ecclesiastic foundations dating from the 16th century. Other landmarks include the Cossack Baroque Assumption Cathedral, a triumphal arch (1787), and the wooden church of St. Nicholas (1760).

Gallery

References

External links

 Novhorod-Siverskyi on the Official Tourism website of Chernihiv Region (in Ukrainian, nice photographs)
 Some of the sites at Podorozh Ukraïnoyu (in Ukrainian, with pictures)
 Forum (in Russian, city info basically copied from the Wikipedia in Russian)
 The murder of the Jews of Novhorod-Siverskyi during World War II, at Yad Vashem website.

Cities in Chernihiv Oblast
Novgorod-Seversky Uyezd
Cossack Hetmanate
Chernihiv Voivodeship
Cities of district significance in Ukraine
1044 establishments in Europe
Severians
11th-century establishments in Ukraine
Holocaust locations in Ukraine
Populated places on the Desna in Ukraine